The governor of Oaxaca (officially in Spanish Gobernador Constitucional del Estado Libre y Soberano de Oaxaca, in English Constitutional Governor of the Free and Sovereign State of Oaxaca), who  is Alejandro Murat Hinojosa, heads the executive branch of the Mexican state of Oaxaca. The office is created by the state constitution, which specifies a term of 6 years and prohibits reelection. The governor takes office on December 1, and the term ends on November 30 six years later.

Gabino Cué Monteagudo was the first non-Institutional Revolutionary Party governor elected since 1929.

Governors of the state of Oaxaca
(1917–1919): Juan Jiménez Méndez
(1920–1924): Manuel García Vigil
(1923): Flavio Pérez Gasga (Interim)
(1924–1925): Onofre Jiménez
(1925–1928): Genaro V. Vázquez
(1928–1932): Francisco López Cortés

(1932–1936): Anastasio García Toledo, National Revolutionary Party, PNR
(1936–1940): Constantino Chapital, PNR
(1940–1944): Vicente González Fernández, Party of the Mexican Revolution, PRM
(1944–1947): Edmundo M. Sánchez Cano, PRM
(1947–1950): Eduardo Vasconcelos 
(1950–1952): Manuel Mayoral Heredia 
(1952–1955): Manuel Cabrera Carrasqueado 
(1955): Manuel I. Manjardín (Interim) 
(1955–1956): José Pacheco Iturribarría (Interim) 
(1956–1962): Alfonso Pérez Gasca 
(1962–1968): Rodolfo Brena Torres 
(1968–1970): Víctor Bravo Ahuja 
(1970–1974): Fernando Gómez Sandoval 
(1974–1977): Miguel Zárate Aquino 
(1977–1980): Eliseo Jiménez Ruiz 
(1980–1985): Pedro Vázquez Colmenares 
(1985–1986): Jesús Martínez Álvarez 
(1986–1992): Heladio Ramírez López 
(1992–1998): Diódoro Carrasco Altamirano 
(1998–2004): José Murat Casab 
(2004–2010): Ulises Ruiz Ortiz 
(2010–2016): Gabino Cué Monteagudo, Citizens' Movement
(2016–2022): Alejandro Murat Hinojosa 
(2022-Present): Salomón Jara Cruz Morena

See also
 List of Mexican state governors

References

 http://rulers.org/mexstat.html

Oaxaca